Chris or Christopher Neal, Neil, or Neill may refer to:

Sport
Chris Neal (footballer, born 1947), English winger who played for Darlington
Chris Neil (born 1979), Canadian ice hockey player
Chris Neal (born 1985), English footballer who plays for Salford City

Music and Entertainment
Chris Neal (songwriter) (born 1946), Australian musician
Chris Neal, pseudonym of Daniel Knauf, American television and comic book writer
Christopher Neil (born 1948), British record producer    
Chris Neill (born 1968), British comedian and radio personality

Other
Christopher Paul Neil (born 1975), Canadian sex criminal

See also
Chris Neild (born 1987), American football player, played in NFL for the Washington Redskins and Houston Texans
Christopher Neil-Smith (1920–1995), Church of England priest and exorcist